Terrance Lamont Turner (February 28, 1881 – July 18, 1960), nicknamed "Cotton Top", was an American professional baseball infielder. He played in Major League Baseball (MLB) from 1901 to 1919 for the Pittsburgh Pirates, Cleveland Naps / Indians, and Philadelphia Athletics.

Biography
Because normal slides hurt his ankles, he pioneered the use of the head-first slide. As a fielder, he spent most of his playing time between  shortstop and third base. He also broke up three no-hitters and spoiled a perfect game effort by Chief Bender after receiving a fourth-inning walk.

In 1904 Turner started a long tenure with Cleveland that lasted 15 years, appearing in a team-record 1,619 games. He hit a career-high .308 in 1912, and from 1906 to 1911 averaged 25.5 steals in each season, with a career-high 31 in 1910. On the field, he led the American League shortstops in fielding percentage four times. He also ranks among the top 10 Cleveland players in seven  different offensive categories and still the team-mark in putouts with 4,603. For over seventy-seven years, Turner also held the Indians' team record for the most career stolen bases with 254. His record was broken by Kenny Lofton in 1996, and has since also been surpassed by Omar Vizquel, who did so in 2003.

In a 17-season career, Turner was a .253 hitter (1499-for-5921) with eight home runs and 528 RBI in 1659 games, including 699 runs, 207 doubles, 77 triples, and 256 stolen bases.

Turner died in Cleveland, Ohio, at the age of 79. He was buried at Knollwood Cemetery in Mayfield Heights, Ohio.

In 2001, he was selected to the 100 Greatest Indians Roster, as part of the club's 100th Anniversary Celebration.

See also
List of Major League Baseball career stolen bases leaders

References

External links

Baseball Library
Retrosheet

Cleveland Indians players
Cleveland Naps players
Philadelphia Athletics players
Pittsburgh Pirates players
Major League Baseball shortstops
Major League Baseball third basemen
Baseball players from Pennsylvania
Columbus Senators players
1881 births
1960 deaths
Burials at Knollwood Cemetery
 People from Mercer County, Pennsylvania